Waco is a town in Cleveland County, North Carolina, United States. The population was 321 at the 2010 census.

History
A post office called Waco has been in operation since 1880. The town was named after Waco, Texas.

Geography
Waco is located at  (35.362026, -81.429113).

Demographics

As of the census of 2000, there were 328 people, 134 households, and 92 families residing in the town. The population density was 408.2 people per square mile (158.3/km). There were 145 housing units at an average density of 180.5 per square mile (70.0/km). The racial makeup of the town was 80.49% White, 18.29% African American, 0.30% Native American, 0.30% Pacific Islander, and 0.61% from two or more races.

There were 134 households, out of which 23.1% had children under the age of 18 living with them, 55.2% were married couples living together, 9.7% had a female householder with no husband present, and 31.3% were non-families. 26.1% of all households were made up of individuals, and 6.7% had someone living alone who was 65 years of age or older. The average household size was 2.45 and the average family size was 2.91.

In the town, the population was spread out, with 21.0% under the age of 18, 8.8% from 18 to 24, 29.9% from 25 to 44, 26.2% from 45 to 64, and 14.0% who were 65 years of age or older. The median age was 39 years. For every 100 females, there were 105.0 males. For every 100 females age 18 and over, there were 103.9 males.

The median income for a household in the town was $32,031, and the median income for a family was $38,750. Males had a median income of $27,083 versus $21,250 for females. The per capita income for the town was $20,081. About 9.1% of families and 8.3% of the population were below the poverty line, including 9.4% of those under age 18 and none of those age 65 or over.

Notable person 
Floyd Patterson, heavyweight boxing champion

References

Towns in North Carolina
Towns in Cleveland County, North Carolina